At least two vessels named Royal Captain sailed as East Indiamen for the British East India Company:

 : launched in 1760 and made four voyages to India, the East Indies, and China between 1761 and 1771.
 : launched in 1772 and wrecked in 1773 in the South China Sea.

Ships of the British East India Company
Age of Sail merchant ships
Merchant ships of the United Kingdom
Ship names